Dan Nicolae Potra (born 28 July 1979 in Timișoara) is a retired Romanian artistic gymnast who was Romania's first male gymnast to win the  European all around title (2002). He is an Olympic bronze medalist with the team and a three time continental gold medalist.

References

1979 births
Living people
Sportspeople from Timișoara
Romanian male artistic gymnasts
Olympic gymnasts of Romania
Gymnasts at the 2004 Summer Olympics
Olympic bronze medalists for Romania
European champions in gymnastics
Olympic medalists in gymnastics
Medalists at the 2004 Summer Olympics